Oswald Leslie De Kretser may refer to:

 Oswald Leslie De Kretser II, Ceylonese Judge 
 Oswald Leslie De Kretser III, Ceylonese Judge